In January 1974 a flood occurred in Brisbane, Queensland, Australia after three weeks of continual rain. The Brisbane River, which runs through the heart of the city, broke its banks and flooded the surrounding areas. The cyclone that produced the flood also flooded surrounding cities: Ipswich, Beenleigh, and the Gold Coast.

In total, there were 16 fatalities, 300 people injured, 8,000 homes destroyed and an estimated A$980 million in damages.

Flood waters

It had been an exceptionally wet spring, and by the end of October most of southern Queensland's river systems were nearing capacity. Cyclone Wanda pushed the systems to the limit, and drew the monsoonal trough southward, providing the additional rainfall to the Brisbane River, Bremer River and Stanley River catchments to produce widespread and severe flooding. In the early morning of 25 January heavy rain began to fall on Brisbane. During a 36-hour period 642 mm of rain fell on the city. These torrential rains were caused by Wanda, a relatively weak tropical cyclone which did not even rate as a category 1 cyclone.

Continual, heavy rain had fallen for three weeks, leading up to the flood, which occurred on Sunday, 27 January 1974, during the Australia Day weekend. The floods peaked at  according to the Port Office gauge at high tide at 2:15 am on 29 January.

Damage
Large areas were inundated, with at least 6,700 homes flooded.  Around 13,000 buildings were affected by flooding in some way. Buildings in the Brisbane central business district were particularly hard hit.

The 67,320 tonne Robert Miller broke its moorings at Kangaroo Point and became adrift in the river. Because the ship was 237 metres long and the river was about 255 metres wide, it was feared that the ship could form a dam across the river. This would have caused the river to rise by a further 3 metres, leading even greater flooding in the suburbs. Two tugboats were needed to control the 15 m high and 239 m long oil tanker. The Robert Miller was the largest ship ever built in Australia at the time.

A gravel barge became caught under the Centenary Bridge where it damaged the pylons, causing fear that the bridge would be swept away. The barge was sunk to reduce the risk.

The most flood-affected suburb of Brisbane was Rocklea.

Close to Ipswich, 1,800 premises were affected by flooding.

The Nerang River flooded, cutting the Gold Coast off from Brisbane. About 2,000 people were evacuated from homes along the river and the canals; most of these homes suffered flood damage.

While not as high as the floods in the 1800s this flood is considered to have been worse due to Brisbane's rapidly increasing population at the time.

Many houses were also damaged by land subsidence and land slippage associated with the flooding and high rainfall.

Fatalities
Sixteen people lost their lives, including twelve people who were drowned in Brisbane and Ipswich.

The first flood related deaths were at 11:20pm on 24 January. Raymond Roy Davidson (29 years, from Wacol) and Hazel Dulcie Afflick (40 years) were killed in a head-on collision at Wacol, both drivers being blinded by gale-force winds and heavy rain.

An army amphibious LARC vehicle was carrying out excavation work at Bellbowrie when the vehicle hit submerged power lines which were still live. Two men, Corporal Neville Hourigan and Captain Ian Kerr of the Australian Army Reserve (then called the Citizens Military Force) were thrown from the vehicle. Bill Lickiss jumped into the water to save them and another CMF soldier, Corporal Ray Ruddy, swam from his undamaged vessel to take control of LARC 05. Hourigan died at the scene and Kerr's body was found after the flood had subsided. Lickiss and Ruddy were both awarded the Queen's Gallantry Medal.

A young child, Shane David Patterson (of Yeronga) was swept from his father's arms on a causeway over Oxley Creek in Inala and drowned.

In addition to those that drowned, Robert Adams (aged 56 years) died of a heart attack during an evacuation of a caravan park at Newmarket. Aidan Sutton, a civilian working with the Queensland Police, aged 50 years, returned home to St Lucia for his reading glasses and was swept away in the flood waters, his body found in a tree.

Flood mitigation

As a result of the flood, planning for the Wivenhoe Dam included flood mitigation as well as its original water supply purpose.

The flood was a defining event for a generation of Brisbane residents. In 2009 as part of the Q150 celebrations, the 1974 Brisbane flood was announced as one of the Q150 Icons of Queensland for its role as a "Defining Moment".

The renewed awareness of the flood hazard in this rapidly growing region gave the state an opportunity to significantly re-think flood management and mitigation practices. This opportunity was missed, and the introduction of the Local Government (Planning and Environment) Act 1990 largely upheld conventional planning and development. The dependence on dams was confirmed; a flood plan policy was not introduced until the 21st century. Only 36 years later, the region suffered another disaster of similar magnitude during the 2010–11 Queensland floods.

See also

 Corinda landslip
 List of disasters in Australia by death toll

References

External links

The "Big Wet", Bureau of Meteorology
Known Floods in the Brisbane and Bremer River Basin, Bureau of Meteorology
Flood map of Brisbane & suburbs / drawn and published at the Survey Office, Department of Lands, Brisbane, Feb. 1974 (Link via National Library of Australia)
Local Government (Planning and Environment) Act 1990
Gary Golding 1974 Brisbane Flood Video - State Library of Queensland
API-84 1974 Flood Photograph Album: Digitised images - State Library of Queensland
Ann Shevill's St Lucia Flood Photographs: Digitised images - State Library of Queensland

Brisbane River floods
Disasters in Brisbane
History of Brisbane
Brisbane flood
1974 disasters in Australia
1970s in Brisbane
Brisbane Flood, 1974
Weather events in Australia